Picpus Cemetery is the largest private cemetery in Paris, France, located in the 12th arrondissement. It was created from land seized from the convent of the Chanoinesses de St-Augustin, during the French Revolution. Just minutes away from where the guillotine was set up, it contains 1,306 victims executed between 14 June and 27 July 1794, during the height and last phase of the Reign of Terror.

Picpus Cemetery is one of only two private cemeteries in Paris. Today, only descendants of the 1,306 victims are eligible to be buried at Picpus Cemetery.

The cemetery is of particular interest to American visitors as it also holds the tomb of the Marquis de Lafayette (1757–1834), over which an American flag always flies.

Origins 
The place name, Picpus, is thought to derive from French pique-puce, "flea-bite", because the local monks used to cure skin diseases that caused wounds that resembled fleabites.

In the pre-Revolutionary period, the premises upon which the cemetery is now found was a walled garden and a convent.  The convent was occupied by the Canonesses of Saint Augustine, but their property was confiscated during the Revolution and they were forced to leave by the Revolutionary government in 1792.

The property was then sold to a commoner, Coignard, who turned it into a maison de santé — a kind of convalescent home that also served as a prison for those fortunate enough to be able to pay the rent. Several aristocrats rented rooms from him during the Terror. The novelist Choderos de Laclos, the Marquis de Sade and the philosopher Comte de Volney all spent part of the Terror on the premises.

The cemetery is situated next to a small chapel, Notre-Dame-de-la-Paix ("Our Lady of Peace"). It is part of the cemetery complex and holds a small 15th-century sculpture of the Vierge de la Paix, reputed to have cured King Louis XIV of a serious illness on 16 August 1658.

Reign of Terror 

During the French Revolution, the guillotine was set up in the Place de la Nation, then called the Place du Trône Renversé. Between 13 June and 28 July 1794, during the height of, but also the final two months of the period known as the Reign of Terror.

The pace of beheading at the Trône Renversé location was rapid. As many as 55 people per day were executed. Of the 2639 executions carried out in Paris between April 1793 and July 1794, the six weeks of operation of the Trône guillotine accounted for almost half (1306 executions).

The Revolutionary Tribunal needed a quick but relatively anonymous way to dispose of the bodies. Furthermore, it was necessary to keep a low profile for the burials because the Terror was already becoming unpopular and the local populations resented having so many dead bodies buried in their neighborhood.

The Picpus garden was only five minutes by foot from the spot where the guillotine was set up on what is now Place de la Nation. In June 1794, a pit was dug at the end of the garden where the decapitated bodies were thrown in together — noblemen and nuns, grocers and soldiers, labourers and innkeepers. The bodies were brought to the garden by cart and entered the garden via an entryway located at what is now 40, 42 avenue de Saint Mandé. The clothes were removed and inventoried and the bodies were thrown in the pit. The pit was left opened until it was covered and quicklime was spread to counter the odor of decomposing bodies.

At the beginning, compensation for the workmen accomplishing the burials consisted only of the clothes removed from the victims of the guillotine. Later, with so many executions taking place, this was thought to be excessive and the Revolutionary government kept for itself the proceeds from the sale of the clothes of the victims.

A second pit was dug a few weeks later when the first filled up. The bodies were tightly packed and the heads were thrown in so as to plug empty spots. Since the plan was to continue executions at a rapid pace in the future, it was felt necessary to use the site efficiently so as to save space for future burials. These plans were not realized, however — the bloodshed stopped when Robespierre himself was beheaded on 29 July 1794 (at what is now place de la Concorde), and the garden closed off.

Counting the dead 
The names of those buried in the two common pits, 1,306 men and women, are inscribed on the walls of the chapel in the cemetery complex. Of the 1,109 men, there were 108 nobles, 108 churchmen, 136 monastics (gens de robe), 178 military, and 579 commoners; 197 women are buried there, with 51 from the nobility, 23 nuns and 123 commoners.

Among the women, 16 Carmelite nuns ranging in age from 29 to 78,  were brought to the guillotine together, singing hymns as they were led to the scaffold, an incident commemorated in Poulenc's opera, Dialogues of the Carmelites. They were beatified in 1906 as the Martyrs of Compiègne.

Discontent with the mass burial site 
As noted above, the residents of the surrounding neighbourhood were unhappy about the burial site at Picpus. At the time, it was believed that many diseases were caused by miasmas, or putrid vapours that were associated with bad smells. Therefore, the presence of 1306 corpses in largely open pits was not only unpleasant, but it was thought to entail a risk for public health. Several weeks before the execution of Robespierre (which effectively ended the Terror), the neighbours sent a petition in which they said that they were justly "alarmed by the proximity of these graves, destined for the burials of conspirators who were struck down by the blade of the law".  The petition also noted that "those who had been declared enemies of the people and the Republic while they were still alive" are now allowed to "assassinate the people after their death." A second petition, sent a few months after the end of the Reign of Terror, adopts an anti-Robespierre tone: "The patriotes in the vicinity demand in the strongest terms the disappearance of the chasm that was dug on the orders of Robespierre and his accomplices in order to bury their victims."

No attempt was made to move the mass burial site from its current location.

Post-Revolution

Creation of a private cemetery 
After the Terror ended, the aristocracy began to return from exile or to leave their hiding places. In 1797, under the Directory, the Picpus site was secretly acquired by Princess Amalie Zephyrine of Salm-Kyrburg, whose brother, Frederick III, Prince of Salm-Kyrburg, was guillotined and buried in one of the common graves.

In the early 1800s, a group of family members (notably, Madame de Lafayette and her sister, Madame de Montagu), launched a search to find the burial place of their loved ones, victims of the Terror. With the help of a young commoner who had lost her father and brother to the guillotine and who had followed the cart to the  burial site, they finally located the mass grave in the garden at Picpus. The difficulty of their search was compounded by the fact that most of the surviving aristocracy was still alive only because they had left France during the Terror. Therefore, they were not present for the executions nor were they able to inform themselves immediately about burial sites. On the other hand, since the mass burial of more than 1,300 people in less than 2 months generated a significant olfactory disturbance in the immediate neighborhood, the local population would have quickly provided relevant information to the enquiring aristocrats.

The aristocrats decided to form a group of interested parties to buy up the land in order to create a memorial and a private cemetery next to the mass burial site. They bought the garden of Picpus by subscription in June 1802.

In a meeting held in 1802, underwriters designated 11 of them to form a committee to manage the project:

 Madame Montagu, née L. D. de Noailles, President
 Maurice de Montmorency
 Mr. Aimard de Nicolaï
 Madame Rebours,  née Barville
 Madame Freteau widow,  née Moreau
 Madame de La Fayette, née Adrienne de Noailles
 Madame Titon,  née Benterot
 Madame Faudoas, née de Bernières
 Madame Charton,  née Chauchat
 Philippe de Noailles de Poix
 Theodule M. de Grammont

Many of these noble families still use the cemetery as a place of burial. Only people whose ancestors were guillotined and buried at Picpus are eligible to be buried in the cemetery. The one exception to this rule is the historian, G. Lenotre (nom-de-plume of Louis Léon Théodore Gosselin; 1855–1935), who wrote a seminal book – Jardin de Picpus – which follows some of the victims on their way to the guillotine and describes what happened subsequently to their bodies and to the garden of Picpus.

Creation of a religious community 
A religious community led by Mother Henriette Aymer de la Chevalerie and Abbé Pierre Coudrin settled in Picpus and rented the pre-existing convent in 1804. The new occupants of the convent were the Sisters of the Congregation of the Sacred Hearts of Mary and Jesus of Perpetual Adoration, whose role was to pray and perform other religious services in memory of the victims and for the redemption of the souls of their executioners.

Later, during the Paris Commune, the community was again afflicted by political violence: the Massacre in the Rue Haxo was a mass execution of priests and gendarmes by communards during the semaine sanglante ("bloody week") at the end of the Paris Commune in May 1871. During this massacre, 110 priests and gendarmes were executed over a period of several days, including the Picpus Fathers Ladislas Radigue, Polycarpe Tuffier, Marcellin Rouchouze and Frézal Tardieu.

The Marquis de Lafayette

Arguably Picpus Cemetery's most famous tomb is that of the Gilbert du Motier, Marquis de Lafayette, the French aristocrat and general who was a close friend of many American Founding Fathers including George Washington, Alexander Hamilton and Thomas Jefferson and John Laurens, and fought in the Continental Army even before France officially entered the American Revolutionary War. Lafayette died in 1834 from natural causes (pneumonia) at the age of 76, and an American flag always flies over his grave, courtesy of the local chapter of the Daughters of the American Revolution. He is buried next to his wife, Adrienne de Lafayette, whose sister, mother and grandmother were among those beheaded and thrown into the common pit. The soil that covers the grave is soil that Lafayette brought home to France from Bunker Hill in Charlestown, Boston – site of the Battle of Bunker Hill, one of the most prominent early battles of the American Revolutionary War; in 1825, on the occasion of the 50th anniversary of the battle, Lafayette had laid the cornerstone of the Bunker Hill Monument.

In response to the French gift of the Statue of Liberty, American diplomat Robert John Thompson sponsored a national subscription to erect an equestrian statue of La Fayette above his tomb on the occasion of the 1900 Exposition Universelle in Paris. The project was entrusted to sculptor Paul Wayland Bartlett, but he missed the 1900 deadline and his  was eventually erected in 1908 in the central square of the Louvre Palace. It was transferred in 1985 to its current location on the Cours-la-Reine, in preparation for the Grand Louvre remodeling.

On 4 July 1917, three months after the United States entered World War I on the side of France and her Allies, U.S. Army Colonel Charles E. Stanton visited the General's tomb. Col. Stanton placed an American flag, uttering the famous phrase: "Lafayette, we are here."

An American flag always flies over the tomb of the Marquis de Lafayette (1757–1834).  It is renewed every  Fourth of July by members of the Daughters of the American Revolution, the Society of the Cincinnati and U.S. embassy officials, who gather at Lafayette's tomb for a celebration.

World War II and protection of interned Jews

During the German occupation of Paris, the American flag flew continuously over Lafayette’s tomb and the German occupiers never entered the cemetery and convent complex.

In 1852, financier James Mayer de Rothschild built, next door to the cemetery, the Rothschild Hospital and hospice for Jewish patients. Under the collusion of Vichy France with Nazi Germany, its patients who survived their illnesses were all deported to concentration camps. The hospital staff managed to save some of their patients from deportation by making false death certificates or false declarations of stillbirth. The patients were then secreted out of the hospital and hidden in the neighborhood, including in the convent located on the Picpus cemetery grounds.

Notable burials in the Picpus Cemetery 
 Marguerite Louise d'Orléans (1645–1721), a Princess of France who became Grand Duchess of Tuscany, as the wife of Grand Duke Cosimo III de' Medici
 1,306 victims of the Reign of terror between 14 June and 27 July 1794, including the following:
 Richard Mique (1728–1794), architect of the Hameau de la reine at the Palace of Versailles, guillotined 8 July 1794
 The 16 Discalced Carmelite women, Martyrs of Compiègne, guillotined on 17 July 1794 and buried in one of the two mass graves
 Henriette Anne Louise d'Aguesseau, Duchess of Noailles, Princess of Tingry (1737–1794), a French salon hostess and duchess, guillotined on 22 July 1794, along with her mother-in-law, Catherine de Cossé-Brissac duchesse de Noailles, and daughter, Anne Jeanne Baptiste Louise vicomtesse d'Ayen.
 Alexandre de Beauharnais (1760–1794), first husband of Josephine de Beauharnais and father of Eugène and Hortense, guillotined on 23 July 1794
 Frederick III, Prince of Salm-Kyrburg (1744–1794), German prince, colonel of the German troops, the battalion commander of the Fontaine-Grenelle, brother-in-law of the prince Anton Aloys, Prince of Hohenzollern-Sigmaringen and brother of Princess Amalie Zephyrine, guillotined on 23 July 1794
 André Chénier (1762–1794), French poet, guillotined on 25 July 1794
 Jean-Antoine Roucher (1745–1794), poet, guillotined on 25 July 1794, as depicted in the engraving The last wagon
 Gilbert du Motier, Marquis de Lafayette (1757–1834), an important figure in both the French and American revolutions, co-author of the Declaration of the Rights of Man and of the Citizen
 Marie Adrienne Françoise de Noailles, Marquise de La Fayette (1759–1807), French marchioness, wife of the Marquis de Lafayette
 Aimé Picquet du Boisguy (1776–1839), a notably young chouan general at the age of 19 during the French Revolution
 "G. Lenotre" (nom-de-plume of Louis Léon Théodore Gosselin) (1855–1935), French academician, historian and author of many works about the French Revolution, including Jardin de Picpus.

Location and status 
The entrance to the cemetery is at 35 rue de Picpus in the 12th arrondissement. It can be visited in the afternoon every day except Sunday and holidays, with hours usually from 2 pm to 5 pm (Admission: €2). The Chapel of Our Lady of Peace is located at the entrance of the cemetery. The nearest Paris metro stations are Nation and Picpus.

This private cemetery and the associated convent were added to the list of Monuments Historiques by the French Ministry of Culture on 30 April 1998.

References

External links 

 Complete list of the 1,306 victims of the Terror buried at Picpus
 Nobility buried at Picpus after the French Revolution
 Picpus, walled garden of memory, Northwestern University Documentary and Digital Archive
 Picpus Cemetery on the Paris Tourist Office website
 

Cemeteries in Paris
Buildings and structures in the 12th arrondissement of Paris
Burials at Picpus Cemetery
Gilbert du Motier, Marquis de Lafayette
1794 events of the French Revolution
1794 establishments in France
Burial sites of the House of Beauharnais